Bertelia dupla is a species of snout moth described by André Blanchard in 1976. It is found in North America, including Texas.

The wingspan is 23–27 mm.

References

Moths described in 1976
Phycitinae